Corona Capital is an annual music festival held in Mexico City, Mexico. It was first held in 2010. In 2018, it was held for the first time in Guadalajara.

Line-ups
All information taken from various sources. Headline performers are listed in Boldface. The acts are listed in the order they performed.

2010
Date: 16 October 2010
Venue: Curva 4 Autódromo Hermanos Rodríguez, Mexico City, Mexico

Stage Corona: Le Butcherettes, Minus the Bear, Two Door Cinema Club, Furland, The Temper Trap, Regina Spektor, James, Pixies

Stage Capital: Dirty Karma, She's A Tease, Flyleaf, Adanowsky, White Lies, Echo & the Bunnymen, Interpol

Stage Corona Light: 60 Tigres, Napoleon Solo, Triángulo de Amor Bizarro, Rey Pila, Chikita Violenta, Delphic, Dapuntobeat, Foals, The Soft Pack

2011
Date: 15 October 2011
Venue: Curva 4 Autódromo Hermanos Rodríguez, Mexico City, Mexico

Corona Stage: Torreblanca, Ximena Sariñana, Austin TV, Mogwai, Coheed and Cambria, The Strokes

Capital Stage: Yellow Yesterday, Ruido Rosa, Le Baron, Wild Beasts, OMD, Santigold, Editors, Portishead

Corona Light Stage: Madame Recaimer, Bengala, Quiero Club, The Antlers, Disco Ruido, CSS, Moby

Bizco Club Stage: Little Ethiopia, Black Fo, El Cuarto, Javiera Mena, Wavves, El Columpio Asesino, No Age, These New Puritans, M83, Toy Selectah & 3Ball MTY, The Rapture

2012
Dates: 13–14 October 2012
Venue: Curva 4 Autódromo Hermanos Rodríguez, Mexico City, Mexico

Corona Stage
Saturday: Los Plastics Revolution, Vicente Gayo, Dum Dum Girls, The Joy Formidable, The Wallflowers, The Kills, The Hives
Sunday: Bam Bam, Tribes, Here We Go Magic, The Big Pink, The Vaccines, M. Ward, My Morning Jacket, The Black Keys

Capital Stage
Saturday: Los Rayobacks, Freelance Whales, La Habitación Roja, Zulu Winter, AWOLNATION, The Airborne Toxic Event, León Larregui, Cat Power, Franz Ferdinand
Sunday: Ventilader, I Can Chase Dragons!, LP, Francisca Valenzuela, Alabama Shakes, The Maccabees, The Drums, Snow Patrol, Florence and the Machine

Corona Light Stage
Saturday: Technicolor Fabrics, MUTEMATH, Hello Seahorse!, The Walkmen, Iron And Wine, Suede
Sunday: Los Impostors, L.A., St. Lucia, Black Lips, The Raveonettes, Tegan and Sara, New Order

Corona Bizco Stage
Saturday: María y José, Bufi, Baio, Unknown Mortal Orchestra, Die Antwoord, Death in Vegas, Major Lazer, Sleigh Bells, Miike Snow, Basement Jaxx
Sunday: Josef Bamba, Memory Man, Rebolledo, Los Rakas, Shabazz Palaces, AraabMuzik, WhoMadeWho, Neon Indian, James Murphy, Modeselektor, A-Trak, DJ Shadow

2013
Dates: 12–13 October 2013
Venue: Curva 4 Autódromo Hermanos Rodríguez, Mexico City, Mexico

Corona Stage
Saturday: Quadron, Io Echo, Chris Lake, White Lies, The xx, Deadmau5
Sunday: Ice Age, The Black Angels, Capital Cities, Miles Kane, The Breeders, Queens of the Stone Age

Capital Stage
Saturday: The Postelles, MS MR, Kurt Vile, Imagine Dragons, Dinosaur Jr., Phoenix
Sunday: Deap Vally, Jake Bugg, Portugal. The Man, Matt and Kim, Stereophonics, Vampire Weekend, Arctic Monkeys

Corona Light Stage
Saturday: Robert DeLong, Palma Violets, The Dandy Warhols, Travis, The Crystal Method
Sunday: Perfume Genius, Gary Clark Jr., Jimmy Eat World, Sigur Rós

Bizco Club Stage
Saturday: Nguzunguzu, Peace, Toy, Jacques Lu Cont, The Presets, M.I.A., Blondie
Sunday: DJ Harvey, Mueran Humanos, Fuck Buttons, Jamie xx, Savages, Grimes,  Giorgio Moroder

2014
Dates: 11–12 October 2014
Venue: Curva 4 Autódromo Hermanos Rodríguez, Mexico City, Mexico

Corona Stage
Saturday: Deafheaven, The Julie Ruin, The Ghost of a Saber Tooth Tiger, Best Coast, Little Dragon, Zedd, Jack White
Sunday: Charming Liars, White Denim, Deorro, Chvrches, Belle and Sebastian, Haim, Kings of Leon

Doritos Stage
Saturday: MØ, Real Estate, Kongos, Biffy Clyro, Holy Ghost!, Weezer, Massive Attack
Sunday: James Bay, Rixton, Sam Smith, Gareth Emery, Kasabian, Foster the People, Beck

Corona Light Stage
Saturday: Black English, Cults, Black Kids, Jenny Lewis, Conor Oberst, MGMT
Sunday: Cut Snake, Young & Sick, St. Vincent, Damon Albarn,
The Kooks

Claro Musica Bizco Club
Saturday: Ricoshëi, Sinjin Hawke, Yung Lean, Hercules & Love Affair, Pond, Jungle, GusGus, SBTRKT, The Horrors
Sunday: Dohko, Phillipp Gorbachev, Kate Boy, Cashmere Cat, Temples, Twin Shadow, Tune-Yards, Sky Ferreira, Metronomy, Lykke Li

2015
Dates: 21–22 November 2015
Venue: Curva 4 Autódromo Hermanos Rodríguez, Mexico City, Mexico

Corona Stage
Saturday: Alvvays, Title Fight, Chairlift, Father John Misty, Ryan Adams, Muse
Sunday: Milo Greene, Sohn, Twenty One Pilots, Spoon, Fatboy Slim, Calvin Harris

Doritos Stage
Saturday: The New Regime, MOTHXR, Benjamin Booker, Kiesza, Kygo, DFA 1979, The Libertines
Sunday: Poppy, Shamir, Miami Horror, Mew, Sleater-Kinney, Pixies

Corona Light Stage
Saturday: Wild Nothing, DIIV, Halsey, The Psychedelic Furs, Richard Ashcroft, Beirut
Sunday: The Griswolds, Circa Waves, The Charlatans, Primal Scream, Ratatat

Claro Musica Tent
Saturday: Humans, Skylar Spence, Goldroom, RAC, Run the Jewels, The Bloody Beetroots, Porter Robinson
Sunday: Bronze Whale, George FitzGerald, Tokimonsta, Brodinski, Robin Schulz, Chromeo

2016
Dates: 19–20 November 2016
Venue: Curva 4 Autódromo Hermanos Rodríguez, Mexico City, Mexico

Corona Stage
Saturday: Gin Wigmore, Eryn Allen Kane, Dashboard Confessional, Courtney Barnett, Haim, The Killers
Sunday: A Silent Film, Saint Motel, Walk the Moon, Yeasayer, Suede, LCD Soundsystem

Doritos Stage
Saturday: Caveman, The Struts, Marian Hill, Edward Sharpe & the Magnetic Zeros, Unknown Mortal Orchestra, Richard Ashcroft, Air
Sunday: Bleached, Yuck, Peter Bjorn and John, Eagles of Death Metal, Grimes, Lana Del Rey

Corona Light Stage
Saturday: Parquet Courts, Wild Beasts, Tegan and Sara, Band of Horses, Pet Shop Boys
Sunday: Delorentos, Allah-Las, Wild Nothing, Super Furry Animals, Warpaint, Kraftwerk

Levi's Tent
Saturday: Gryffin, Cloves, Låpsley, Young Fathers, Fischerspooner, Lost Frequencies, Animal Collective
Sunday: Sofi Tukker, Louis the Child, Frances, AlunaGeorge, Breakbot, Galantis, Mark Ronson vs Kevin Parker

2017
Dates: 18–19 November 2017
Venue: Curva 4 Autódromo Hermanos Rodríguez, Mexico City, Mexico

Corona Stage
Saturday: Palmistry, Circa Waves, Daya, Japandroids, Elbow, Foo Fighters
Sunday: Shy Girls, Parson James, Crystal Fighters, The Drums, The Shins, Green Day

Doritos Stage
Saturday: Sheppard, You Me at Six, Cherry Glazerr, Angel Olsen, Metronomy, Cage the Elephant, The xx
Sunday: LANY, Wild Belle, Mystery Jets, Grouplove, Grizzly Bear, Phoenix

Corona Light Stage
Saturday: Spencer Ludwig, Joseph, Daughter, Mogwai, PJ Harvey, Maxïmo Park
Sunday: Honne, Whitney, Dua Lipa, Cold War Kids, Alt-J

Levi's Tent
Saturday: Anika, Tennyson, Lido, Andrew W.K., DJ Mustard, Banks & Steelz, Kehlani
Sunday: Rafferty, Washed Out, The Sounds, Bakermat, Gorgon City, Boys Noize

2018

Mexico City
Dates: 17–18 November 2018
Venue: Curva 4 Autódromo Hermanos Rodríguez, Mexico City, Mexico

Corona Stage
Saturday: Blank Range, Yungblud, Sparks, Bastille, The Kooks, Robbie Williams
Sunday: Sasha Sloan, San Fermin, Nathaniel Rateliff & the Night Sweats, The Neighbourhood, MGMT, Imagine Dragons

Doritos Stage
Saturday: Gus Dapperton, Pond, Jenny Lewis, The Jesus and Mary Chain, Lorde
Sunday: The New Regime, K.Flay, The Lemon Twigs, The War on Drugs, Nine Inch Nails

Corona Light Stage
Saturday: Pale Waves, Now, Now, Atlas Genius, Panic! at the Disco, Børns, The Chemical Brothers
Sunday: Bad Sounds, Deaf Havana, Digitalism, Death Cab for Cutie, New Order

Levi's Tent
Saturday: Clairo, Quinn XCII, Shannon and the Clams, Petit Biscuit, Friendly Fires, Odesza
Sunday: King Henry, Jai Wolf, A R I Z O N A, Superorganism, Mercury Rev, Chvrches, Khalid

Guadalajara
Date: 7 April 2018
Venue: Foro Alterno, Guadalajara, Mexico

Corona Stage: Frank Turner, Penguin Prison, Tennis, GusGus, David Byrne, The Killers

Capital Stage: Darwin Deez, Poolside, Matt and Kim, Cut Copy, Alanis Morissette

Levi's Tent: Jarami, Anna Lunoe, Snakehips, Alison Wonderland,

2019

Mexico City
Dates: 16–17 November 2019
Venue: Curva 4 Autódromo Hermanos Rodríguez, Mexico City, Mexico

Corona Stage
Saturday: Shaed, Noah Cyrus, King Princess, The B-52's, Franz Ferdinand, The Strokes
Sunday: The Front Bottoms, Snail Mail, Two Feet, The Voidz, Bloc Party, Interpol

Corona Light Stage
Saturday: Phosphorescent, Bad Suns, St. Lucia, Cat Power, Travis, Two Door Cinema Club
Sunday: Kero Kero Bonito, Car Seat Headrest, Broken Social Scene, The Raconteurs, Billie Eilish

Doritos Stage
Saturday: Inhaler, Blossoms, Alice Merton, Phantogram, Weezer
Sunday: Brutus, Kurt Vile, Sofi Tukker, Flume, Keane

Levi's Tent
Saturday: Sales, Mija , Miami Horror, Poolside, Tycho, Dirty Projectors, Nick Murphy FKA Chet Faker
Sunday: Dear Boy, In the Valley Below, The Midnight, Elderbrook, Max, Polo & Pan, Years & Years

Seat Stage
Saturday: Pip Blom, Keuning, Georgia, SWMRS, Bruno Major, The Japanese House
Sunday: Lucy Dacus, Still Woozy, Yung Bae, Hippie Sabotage, Sharon Van Etten

Guadalajara
Date: 11 May 2019
Venue: Estadio Akron, Guadalajara, Mexico

Corona Stage: Boy Pablo, Of Montreal, Honne, White Lies, Christine and the Queens, OMD, Phoenix, Tame Impala

Kia Stage: TOPS, The Joy Formidable, Kimbra, Rhye, Goo Goo Dolls, Yeah Yeah Yeahs, The Chemical Brothers

Levi's Tent: GG Magree, Classixx, Holy Ghost!, Goldroom, Jax Jones, Chromeo, Dillon Francis

2021

Mexico City
Date: 20–21 November 2021
Venue: Curva 4 Autódromo Hermanos Rodríguez, Mexico City, Mexico

Corona Stage:
Saturday: Hana, Elliot Moss, All Time Low, Cheap Trick, Tame Impala
Sunday: Niko Rubio, Will Joseph Cook, The Lightning Seeds, Aurora, Royal Blood, Twenty One Pilots

Corona Cero Stage:
Saturday: Missio, SG Lewis, Turnstile, Khruangbin, The Kooks
Sunday: Sir Chloe, Alaina Castillo, The Whitest Boy Alive, Jehnny Beth

Doritos Stage:
Saturday: Alfie Templeman, Boy Pablo, Bleachers, LP, Disclosure
Sunday: Adam Melchor, Cautious Clay, Parquet Courts, The Bravery, Rüfüs Du Sol

Viva Aerobus Stage:
Saturday: Goss, Fakear, !!! (DJ set), Electric Guest, Slowthai, Ashnikko
Sunday: Jvke, Glaive, Ela Minus, George FitzGerald, Pabllo Vittar, 070 Shake, Flight Facilities

Bosque Stage:
Saturday: Hamzaa, Faye Webster, Ritt Momney, Yendry, Dayglow
Sunday: Gaia Gozzi, Smith & Thell, Flamingosis, JP Saxe, Nessa Barrett

2022

Mexico City
Date: 18–20 November 2022
Venue: Curva 4 Autódromo Hermanos Rodríguez, Mexico City, Mexico

Guadalajara
Date: 21–22 May 2022
Venue: Valle VFG, Guadalajara, Mexico

Corona Agua Rifada Stage
Saturday: Cass McCombs, Whitney, X Ambassadors, Metronomy, Chvrches, The Strokes
Sunday: Alexandra Savior, Gabriel Garzón-Montano, Young the Giant, Chet Faker, Kings of Leon

KIA Stage
Saturday: Savoir Adore, Julia Holter, The Drums, Metric, Death Cab for Cutie, Blondie
Sunday: Billie Marten, Margaret Glaspy, Inner Wave, Smash Mouth, Jake Bugg, The Hives

Viva Tent
Saturday: Tirzah, Loyal Lobos, Q, Cavetown, Kamasi Washington, Miami Horror
Sunday: Charlotte Adigéry & Bolis Pupul, French 79, !!!, Anna of the North, Digitalism, Tove Lo

References

External links

Music festivals established in 2010
Music festivals in Mexico